Tom Malmquist (born March 23, 1978 in Sweden), is a poet and an author. His most notable work is his auto-biographical and award-winning novel In Every Moment We Are Still Alive [I varje ögonblick är vi fortfarande vid liv, 2015].

In the novel, the main character's partner Karin is diagnosed with acute myeloid leukemia 33 weeks into her pregnancy. Tom and Karin’s daughter Livia is born via cesarean section, but just a week after her birth Karin passes. A few months later, Tom’s father also loses the battle against cancer. In Every Moment We Are Still Alive has been called “furiously beautiful” by the Swedish press and received several of the country’s most prestigious literary awards, amongst else the Karin Boye Literary Prize (2015) and Dagens Nyheter Culture Prize (2016). Malmquist was additionally shortlisted for the Nordic Council’s Literature Prize (2016).

In Every Moment We Are Still Alive is sold to twenty countries: Germany, France, China, and others. In February 2018, The New York Times listed it as “12 New Books We Recommend This Week.” The New York Times additionally listed the novel as a “100 Notable Books of 2018” title. The Spanish newspaper El País chose it as one of this decade’s nine best books about life and death. The Guardian called it “a deeply personal account of loss.”

Malmquist is also a highly acclaimed poet in Sweden. To date he has published two collections of poetry in his homeland, both praised by the Swedish critics.

Awards 
2018: The Stina and Erik Lundberg Foundation Grant

2016: Dagens Nyheter Culture Prize – I varje ögonblick är vi fortfarande vid liv

2016: Shortlisted for the Nordic Council’s Literature Prize The Nordic Countries – I varje ögonblick är vi fortfarande vid liv

2015: The Karin Boye Literary Prize Sweden – I varje ögonblick är vi fortfarande vid liv

2015: The Albert Bonnier Scholarship Fund for Swedish writers Sweden – I varje ögonblick är vi fortfarande vid liv

Bibliography 
2018: In Every Moment We Are Still Alive (Melville House)

2017: In Every Moment We Are Still Alive (Sceptre / Hodder & Stoughton)

2015: I varje ögonblick är vi fortfarande vid liv (Memoir) (Natur & Kultur)

References

External links
Wahlström & Widstrand
Natur & Kultur
Salomonsson Agency

Swedish poets
Swedish male writers
Living people
1978 births
Swedish male poets